Yosef Harish ( ‎ 1923 – 6 November 2013) was an Israeli jurist who served as the country's Attorney General between 1986 and 1993.

Biography
Born in Jerusalem in 1923, Harish was educated in a yeshiva. He joined the Haganah, and volunteered for the British Army during World War II, before serving as an officer in the 1948 Arab-Israeli War.

He studied for bachelor's and master's degrees in law at the Hebrew University of Jerusalem, and began working as a magistrate. He became a judge in the Tel Aviv District court in 1969, and later became its vice-president. In 1986 Harish was appointed Attorney General. His predecessor Yitzhak Zamir had resigned after refusing to abandon an investigation into the activities of the head of Israel's GSS. A year later Harish set up the Landau Commission to investigate methods used by the GSS.

He left the post on 1 November 1993 and was replaced by Michael Ben-Yair.

Harish died on 6 November 2013. At the time of his death Harish resided in the Ramat Aviv area of Tel Aviv.

References

1923 births
2013 deaths
People from Jerusalem
Jews in Mandatory Palestine
Haganah members
British Army personnel of World War II
Israeli soldiers
Hebrew University of Jerusalem Faculty of Law alumni
20th-century Israeli judges
Attorneys General of Israel
Zionists